Grey Sox may refer to a number of defunct baseball teams in the Negro Southern League:

Atlanta Black Crackers
Bessemer Grey Sox
Montgomery Grey Sox